Trees in Chinese mythology and culture tend to range from more-or-less mythological such as the Fusang tree and the Peaches of Immortality cultivated by Xi Wangmu to mythological attributions to such well-known trees, such as the pine, the cypress, the plum and other types of prunus, the jujube, the cassia, and certain as yet unidentified trees. Mythological ideas about trees also extends to various types of fungi which lived or were thought to live underneath certain of these trees, collecting their mysterious essences.

Pine, cypress, and fir

The pine, cypress, and fir are linked by being similar evergreens. Old pine trees are much admired and venerated. Some examples of Chinese cultural symbology can be found in the poetry of Six Dynasties poet Tao Yuanming (365?–427). According to Yeh Chia-ying, one of Tao's most frequently used metaphors is that of the pine tree: symbol of ability to withstand the adversity of cold winds, to withstand the adversity of frosts, nevertheless retaining its own essential character: a situation which can be compared with that of certain persons of metaphorically similar character.

Peach, pear, and plum

The peach, pear, and plum are linked by being in the genus Prunus. All three are important in Chinese symbolism.

Fusang

The Fusang tree appears as a more mythological tree, although sometimes claimed to be just like some kind of mulberry.

Three Friends in Winter

The 'three friends in winter' is a motif frequently seen in Chinese art. The motif consists of pines, bamboos, and plum trees or else plum trees and a stone. The symbolism is that of longevity, constancy, and flowering during winter, before it is yet spring. In Chinese cultural symbology, this motif is considered suitable to send to those who are poor or lonely. The three friends of winter motif is known as early as the Song dynasty work the Jishanji (霽山集), or, in English, the "Clear Mountain Collection" by Lin Jingxi (林景熙), who lived 1242–1310.

Glossary
Chinese terms related to trees in Chinese mythology and cultural symbology:

Cypress:
Fusang:
Peach:
Pine (sometimes also used for similar evergreen conifers, such as fir):
Plum: or 
Three Friends in Winter: or just

Gallery

See also
Bamboo
Chinese mythology, for general information
Four Gentlemen
Ink stick
Peaches of Immortality
Penghou
Pinus armandii
Three Friends of Winter
Wolfiporia extensa
Xi Wangmu
Yu Shi

Notes

References
 
 

Chinese culture
Trees in mythology